Oine may refer to:
Kusumoto Ine, Japanese physician
Oene (disambiguation), various places in Greece